Here We Go! is the second studio album by Japanese boy band Arashi. It is the first studio album to be released under their new label J Storm after moving from the Pony Canyon label. The album was released in Japan on July 17, 2002, in two editions: a regular edition and a first-press limited edition. Both editions bear different covers. It was certified gold by the RIAJ in July 2002. The album was released digitally on February 7, 2020.

Singles
The album includes the singles "A Day in Our Life", the main theme song for the drama Kisarazu Cat's Eye starring V6 member Junichi Okada, Arashi member Sho Sakurai, Ryuta Sato and Yoshinori Okada, and "Nice na Kokoroiki", the eleventh ending theme song for the anime Kochira Katsushika-ku Kameari Kōen-mae Hashutsujo.

Track listing

Charts and certifications

Weekly charts

Certifications

References

External links
Here We Go! product information  

2002 albums
Arashi albums
J Storm albums